Annie d'Arco (28 October 1920 – 5 March 1998) was a 20th-century French classical pianist.

Biography 
Born in Marseille, d'Arco studied the piano with Marguerite Long and won the Geneva competition in 1946. She gave her first concert with the Orchestre Lamoureux, under the direction of Eugène Bigot.

She performed both as a soloist and as a chamber musician, notably with Henryk Szeryng, André Navarra, Jean-Pierre Rampal, Jean-Éric Thirault and Pierre Pierlot. She taught the piano at the École normale de musique de Paris for many years, and had many students with distinguished careers, including  Christophe Larrieu, Catherine Joly and Marylin Frascone. She was married to Gilbert Coursier, a French horn player.

D'Arco died in the 2nd arrondissement of Paris at age 77.

Discography 
 Emmanuel Chabrier: 10 pièces pittoresques, Habanera; Calliope publisher – CAL. 1828 (1974)
 César Franck, Sylvio Lazzari: Sonatas for violin and piano, with Michel Benedetto; Calliope publisher - CAL. 1814
 Camille Saint-Saëns: Sonatas for cello and piano, with André Navarra, Calliope – CAL. 1818
 Paul Dukas: Variations, interlude & final sur un thème de Rameau; Gabriel Pierné: Variations en ut mineur, Op. 42.; Calliope, CAL.1811
 Marcel Landowski: Piano Concerto No 2, with the orchestre national de l'ORTF conducted by Jean Martinon, Erato (1970)
Carl Maria Von Weber: Piano Sonata No. 3 in D Minor and No. 4 in E Minor. L'Oiseau-Lyre OL 271 (1964)
 Felix Mendelssohn: Complete Songs Without Words op.19, Op.30, Op.38, Op.53, Op.62, Op.67, Op.85, Op.102  Erato label, Ultimo 2-CD set 3984-25597-2

References

External links 
 Annie d'Arco's discography on Discogs
 Annie d'Arco on Naxos
 Annie d'Arco plays Mendelssohn Preludes & Fugues Op. 35 (YouTube)

20th-century French women classical pianists
1920 births
1998 deaths
Musicians from Marseille
Conservatoire de Paris alumni
Academic staff of the École Normale de Musique de Paris
Women music educators